Carl Emil Michael Schmidt (December 21, 1866 – 8 August 1945) was a Russo-German architect and philatelist. Born in St. Petersburg, his father Karl Friedrich Adolf Ferdinand Schmidt was a German marine engineer from Anklam in Mecklenburg-Strelitz and mother Olga Helena Schmidt was a Baltic German. He is known as a representative of the "brick-style" and the early Art Nouveau in architecture.

Carl Schmidt studied at the St. Petersburg Academy of Arts. His villas and houses adorn the streets of St. Petersburg. In autumn 1918 the Schmidt family was forced to leave Russia and back to Germany. In Germany, he could not follow on his architectural work. He died in 1945 in Magdeburg.

Selected works 
 1897/98. Villa of V. Tiss. Sjezzhinskaya ul, 3
 1897/99. Alexandra asylum for women. Bolshoy prospekt V. O., 49-51
 1899/1900. Building of the Faberge firm. Bolshaya Morskaya ul., 24
 1900/01. Villa and the office of Paul Forostovski. 4 liniya V. O., 9
 1900/04. Own villa in Pavlovsk. 2-ya Krasnoflotskaya ul., 7
 1901/02. Apartment house. Chersonskaya ul., 13
 1907. New building for a girls' school of Emilie Schaffe. 5-ya liniya O. V., 16

Further reading 
 Voigt E., Heidebrecht H. Carl Schmidt. Ein Architekt in St. Petersburg. 1866—1945. — Augsburg, 2007.
 Э. Фогт, Б. М. Кириков. Архитектор Карл Шмидт: Жизнь и творчество. St. Petersburg, 2011. — 

Architects from Saint Petersburg
Art Nouveau architects
1866 births
1945 deaths
Russian philatelists